Fedele is both an Italian surname and a masculine Italian given name. Notable people with the name include:

People with the surname
Adriano Fedele (born 1947), Italian footballer and manager
Cassandra Fedele (died 1558), Italian scholar
Joe Fedele, American businessman
Ivan Fedele (born 1953), Italian classical composer
Matteo Fedele (born 1992), Swiss footballer
Michael Fedele (born 1955), American politician
Pietro Fedele (1873–1943), Italian historian and politician

People with the given name
Fedele Fenaroli (1730–1818), Italian composer
Fedele Fischetti (1732–1792), Italian painter
Fedele de Giorgis (1887–1964), Italian general

Italian-language surnames
Italian masculine given names